The 1964 Tasman Series was an international motor racing series contested in New Zealand and Australia over eight races beginning on 4 January and ending on 2 March. It was the first Tasman Series. The series, which was officially known as the Tasman Championship for Drivers, was organised jointly by the Association of New Zealand Car Clubs Inc. and the Confederation of Australian Motor Sport with the winning driver awarded the Tasman Cup. The championship was open to racing cars using unsupercharged engines of up to 2,500 c.c. capacity.

The inaugural series was a battle of the British-based expatriates with a two-car team led by Australian Jack Brabham and a two-car team of Coopers from Bruce McLaren Motor Racing, led by the New Zealander Bruce McLaren. Although Denny Hulme won the opening round of the series, McLaren took a trifecta of wins in New Zealand setting up the title win. When the teams moved to Australia, Brabham won the first three races, ensuring a thrilling finish, however Brabham was unable to better his score and therefore McLaren emerged as champion. The last round of the series at Longford was won by the Englishman, Graham Hill, securing sixth place in the final standings as a result. Brabham led the final race until the last laps before his car suffered a transmission failure.

The most successful of the local-based drivers was John Youl. Although the Cooper T55 he was driving was three-years old, he took the aging car to six top five finishes. Australian Bib Stillwell only completed in three races, twice beating Youl, including a second place in the Australian Grand Prix. Another competitive local was Frank Matich in his Repco Brabham BT7A, taking pole at Warwick Farm. Whilst leading, his suspension broke and he was forced to retire. With a further four retirements, Matich only finished one race, gaining a third place at Longford.

Results and standings

Races

Points system
Championship points were awarded at each race on the following basis:

Championship placings were determined by points won by drivers in the New Zealand Grand Prix and any two of the other three races held in New Zealand, plus the Australian Grand Prix and any two of the other three races held in Australia.

Standings

References 

1964
Tasman Series
Tasman Series